Totentanz: The Best of Zoth Ommog is a various artists compilation album released on July 7, 1994 by Cleopatra Records.

Reception

AllMusic gave Totentanz: The Best of Zoth Ommog a rating of two out of five possible stars.

Track listing

Personnel
Adapted from the Totentanz: The Best of Zoth Ommog liner notes.

 Endless Graphics – design
 Jo-Ann Greene – liner notes

Release history

References

External links 
 Totentanz: The Best of Zoth Ommog at Discogs (list of releases)

1994 compilation albums
Cleopatra Records compilation albums